Artem Savin (born 20 January 1981) is a professional Ukrainian football defender.

He was acquired from Zorya Luhanks in during the 2008–09 transfer season.

External links

 Official Website Profile

1981 births
Living people
Ukrainian footballers
Footballers from Luhansk
FC Shakhtar Donetsk players
FC Metalurh Donetsk players
FC Mariupol players
FC Kryvbas Kryvyi Rih players
FC Oleksandriya players
FC Zorya Luhansk players
FC Olimpik Donetsk players
Ukrainian Premier League players
Association football defenders
Ukrainian football managers
FSC Mariupol managers